ChandanKumar,  mononymously known as Chandan, Indian is an actor who works in Kannada films, Kannada and Telugu television. He is known for his work in the television soap opera Radha Kalyana and later Lakshmi Baramma, in which he played the role of Chandu, that was aired on Colors Kannada from 2012.

During the time, he was cast in several films for which he had to step out of the serials mid-way. His first film in lead role Parinaya released in 2014 which took two years in the production. He was one of the leads in the multi-starrer film, Luv U Alia (2015) and protagonist in bilingual film Prema Baraha.

Apart from serials and films, Chandan has been contestant for the reality shows such as Pyate Mandi Kadige Bandru, "Dancing Stars season 1" and runner-up in Bigg Boss Kannada 3.

Personal life
Chandan married his co-star Kavitha Gowda on 14 May 2021 in Bengaluru.

Filmography

Films

Television

References

External links
 
 Official Facebook page

Male actors from Mysore
Male actors in Kannada cinema
Indian male film actors
Living people
21st-century Indian male actors
Indian male television actors
1985 births
Bigg Boss Kannada contestants
Male actors in Telugu television